Queen of the Ring is a women's battle rap league. Queen Of The Ring (QOTR) has approximately 41 million YouTube views and around 183k subscribers since its founding in 2010.
Founders Debo and Vague said they created Queen of the Ring as a spinoff of King Of The Ring, which is a tournament for aspiring battle rappers where the winner is secured a spot in the industry leading Ultimate Rap League.

References

Hip hop mass media
2010 establishments
Women in hip hop music